The 1991 Durham mayoral election was held on November 5, 1991 to elect the mayor of Durham, North Carolina. It saw the return of past mayor Harry E. Rodenhizer Jr. to the office, as he unseated incumbent mayor Chester L. Jenkins.

Results

Primary 
The date of the primary was October 9.

General election

References 

Durham
Mayoral elections in Durham, North Carolina
Durham